Raymond Torres-Santos (born June 19, 1958 in Río Piedras, Puerto Rico) is a Classical and Film Music composer and conductor, pianist, arranger, and producer of both classical, film and popular music. He was described as the most versatile Puerto Rican composer active in the 21st century by Malena Kuss in her book, Music in Latin America and the Caribbean: an Encyclopedic History.

Musical career

Overview

Raymond Torres-Santos was named Dean of the College of the Arts at California State University, Long Beach, and was previously Dean of the College of Arts and Communication at William Paterson University in Wayne, New Jersey.

He earned a Bachelor of Arts degree from the Conservatory of Music of Puerto Rico and the University of Puerto Rico. He completed graduate studies at University of California, Los Angeles earning M.A. and Ph.D. degrees in music composition, music theory and literature. He carried out post-doctoral studies at the Ferienkurse fur Neue Musik, Darmstadt, Germany, and later at the University of Padua, Italy. He did further post-doctoral studies at the Center for Computer Research in Music and Acoustics at Stanford University, Eastman School of Music, and Harvard University.

Torres-Santos started performing professionally while in elementary school. At college, he began his musical career as a pianist and arranger for the Puerto Rico Orchestra, Los Hispanos and the Mario Ortiz Orchestra at the Caribe Hilton Hotel, where he accompanied performers including Chita Rivera, Robert Goulet, Diahann Carroll and The Stylistics.

As an arranger, he has worked alongside many artists, including Julio Iglesias, Danny Rivera, Ednita Nazario, Elvis Crespo, Plácido Domingo, Andrea Bocelli, Deborah Voigt, Angela Gheorghiu, Ana Maria Martinez, Anita Rachvilishvili, Rafael Dávila and Juan Luis Guerra.

He was the first Puerto Rican to receive the Frank Sinatra Award in jazz composing and arranging and also the Henry Mancini Award in film scoring in Los Angeles. Torres-Santos has received other awards from organizations including ASCAP, BMI, Meet the Composer, American Composers Forum, and the American Music Center in New York.

After completing his doctoral studies, Torres-Santos became a music professor at various colleges including California State University, San Bernardino, and University of Puerto Rico. He was appointed Chancellor of the Puerto Rico Conservatory of Music.

At the beginning of the 21st century, Torres-Santos lived in the New York City area. He was a professor at City University of New York (CUNY) for six years.

In June 2008, Torres-Santos was appointed Dean of the College of the Arts and Communication of William Paterson University in Wayne, New Jersey, and in 2011 was appointed Dean of the College of the Arts at California State University, Long Beach (in Los Angeles County), where he is a full professor of music composition.

He has traveled to perform as a musician and conductor and as a guest speaker at international events, such as the 28th, 29th, 30th and 31st International Conferences of the International Society for Music Education held in Bologna, Italy (July 2008), Beijing, China (July 2010), Thessaloniki, Greece (July 2012), and Glasgow, Scotland (July 2016) respectively.

He is currently a Vice-President of the Board of Directors of the American Society of Music Arrangers and Composers (ASMAC) and a voting member of the Grammys, for which he has acted as judge.

Compositions

Torres-Santos has composed orchestral, electronic and vocal music for the concert hall, ballet, film, theater, television and radio. He received commissions to compose many of his works, such as the "1898 Overture" commissioned by the Puerto Rico Government’s 1998 Centennial Commission; "Conversations with Silence", commissioned for the New Jersey Chamber Music Society; "Jersey Polyphony", commissioned by the American Composer Forum Continental Harmony Project; "Danza" (Variation on a Theme by Mozart) commissioned by the Casals Festival; "La cancion de las Antillas", commissioned by the Puerto Rico Symphony;  and "Juris Oratorio", commissioned by the University of Puerto Rico. Other orchestral works include: "El Pais de los Cuatro Pisos", a symphonic poem; and "Sinfonia del Milenio", a symphonic tour of history from creation to present times in an audiovisual format. In 2014, "Symphonia: Resonantia Luminosa Infinita" for brass and orchestra was commissioned by the Casals Festival.

Performances

Torres-Santos' works have been performed or commissioned by the American Composers Orchestra; National Chinese Orchestra; Warsaw Conservatory of Music Chorus and Orchestra; Pacific Symphony; Reading Orchestra; Queens Symphony; North Massachusetts Philharmonic, Soria Symphony (Spain); the Canadian Opera Company Orchestra; the (national) symphony orchestras of London, Vienna, Vancouver, Toronto, Taipei, Virginia, Puerto Rico and the Dominican Republic; Youth Symphony of the Americas; American Youth Symphony; Bronx Arts Ensemble; Continuum; New Jersey Chamber Music Society; West Point Woodwind Quintet; Newark Boys Choir; North Jersey Philharmonic Glee Club; North/South Consonance; Quintet of the Americas; Voix-Touche; and many other independent groups in the US, Spain, Italy, Germany, and Argentina.

His music was played at the Casals Festival, World Fair in Seville, Venice Biennale and Op Sail 2000. It has been used for television and radio programs, and choreographed by dance companies.

Recordings

Among recordings of his works are La Canción de las Antillas, recorded by the Puerto Rico Symphony Orchestra in 1990; Requiem, released by RTS Music Records in 1997 and featuring mezzo-soprano Ilca Lopez and baritone Rafael Cotto; Fantasia Caribeña, recorded by the San Juan Pops Orchestra in 2000; and Jubilum in 2017, Aureola in 2019, Satellites, Drones and Planes in 2021 and Gwakia Baba in 2022 under the RTS Music label. His music arrangements have been recorded by Sony Music (classical and pop). In 2014 he also produced under the RTS Music, Antillano, as a jazz pianist.

Piano

As a studio and jazz pianist in Los Angeles, he worked with the Maynard Ferguson, Freddie Hubbard, Bobby Shaw, and Tito Puente and has been featured in film scores.

Conducting

He conducted the London Session Orchestra, Taipei Philharmonic, Cosmopolitan Symphony Orchestra, Puerto Rico Symphony and Philharmonic Orchestras, Dominican Republic National Orchestra, Queens Symphony Orchestra, Adelphi Chamber Orchestra, Bronx Arts Ensemble Orchestra, and Hollywood Studio Orchestras in concerts and recordings. He was music director for pop singer Vikki Carr and Dianne Schuur.

Scholarly work
He has written articles in peer-reviewed journals from Hofstra University and CUNY as well as the Cambridge Scholar Publishing and Almenara Press. He is the general editor of Music Education in the Caribbean and Latin America, published by Rowman & Littlefield Publishing in conjunction with the National Association for Music Education (NAfME).

See also 

List of Puerto Ricans
Puerto Rican songwriters

References

External links
Scholar Biography - Dr. Raymond Torres-Santos, Chair of the Music Department, University of Puerto Rico at prdream.com
Biography from  Fundación Nacional para la Cultura Popular

Puerto Rican composers
Puerto Rican male composers
People from Río Piedras, Puerto Rico
University of California, Los Angeles alumni
University of Puerto Rico faculty
City University of New York faculty
William Paterson University faculty
Living people
1958 births